Gloria's Romance is a 1916 American silent film serial starring Billie Burke. Serial films, also called chapter plays, were shorter films that were typically run before the main feature film, each of which was part of a longer story, and ended in a cliffhanger, thus encouraging the audience to return every week.

The film was Burke's second outing as a film actress, and one of the very rare occasions in which a Broadway performer of her magnitude starred in a chapter play. In its original form, this serial comprised 20 chapters and was 40 reels long, which was several chapters longer than most film serials of the time.

Gloria's Romance marked the debut of actor Richard Barthelmess. It was written by Rupert Hughes and his wife and produced by George Kleine. Walter Edwin and Colin Campbell served as principal directors. It is a lost film.

Cast

Billie Burke as Gloria Stafford (credited as Miss Billie Burke)
Henry Kolker as Dr. Stephen Royce
David Powell as Richard Freneau, a Broker
William Roselle as David Stafford, Gloria's Brother
Frank Belcher as Frank Lulry, Freneau's Partner
William T. Carleton as Pierpont Stafford
Jule Power as Lois Freeman, Judge Freeman's Daughter
Henry Weaver as Judge Freeman
Frank McGlynn, Sr. as Gideon Trask
Helen Hart as Nell Trask
Maxfield Moree as Stass Casimir
Maurice Steuart as
Rapley Holmes as Chooey McFadden
Adelaide Hastings as Gloria's Governess
Ralph Bunker
Richard Barthelmess - extra (uncredited)

Plot
An adventurous young girl in Florida (Burke) gets lost in the Everglades. There she finds terror and excitement, as well as the rivalry of two men in love with her.

List of chapters

Lost in the Everglades 
Caught by the Seminoles 
A Perilous Love 
The Social Vortex 
The Gathering Storm 
Hidden Fires 
The Harvest of Sin 
The Mesh of Mystery 
The Shadow of Scandal 
Tangled Threads 
The Fugitive Witness 
Her Fighting Spirit 
The Midnight Riot 
The Floating Trap 
The Murderer at Bay 
A Modern Pirate 
The Tell-Tale Envelope 
The Bitter Truth 
Her Vow Fulfilled 
Love's Reward

See also
List of lost films

References

External links

Still of Billie Burke and David Powell
 Poster to chapter "The Shadow of Scandal"

1916 films
American silent serial films
Lost American films
Films directed by Colin Campbell
American black-and-white films
Films produced by George Kleine
1916 lost films
1910s American films